Melhania latibracteolata is a plant in the family Malvaceae, native to East Africa.

Description
The flowers have pale yellow petals.

Distribution and habitat
Melhania latibracteolata is native to Ethiopia, Kenya and Somalia. It is known from fewer than 10 sites.

References

latibracteolata
Flora of Ethiopia
Flora of Kenya
Flora of Somalia
Plants described in 2007